Mycteriacetus is an extinct genus of dolphin from the Early Miocene (Burdigalian) of northeastern Italy. The type species is M. bellunensis.

Etymology
Mycteriacetus is named after the Yellow-billed stork (Mycteria ibis) because the bill of that species is as long as the rostrum of Mycteriacetus.

Taxonomy
Mycteriacetus bellunensis was originally named as a new species of Eurhinodelphis, E. bellunensis, by Pilleri (1985). However, Bianucci and Landini (2002) transferred this species to Argyrocetus, creating the new combination A. bellunensis. Lambert (2004) eventually recognized E. bellunensis as sufficiently distinct from Eurhinodelphis and Argyrocetus to warrant a new genus, Mycteriacetus.

References

Prehistoric toothed whales
Prehistoric cetacean genera
Fossil taxa described in 2004